Sawabir is in an old district in Sharq area in Capital Governorate in Kuwait.  It is a large, mainly residential district of Kuwait City. Sharq's total population stood at about 16,000

The city is home to the Imam Ja'far as-Sadiq Mosque, one of the country's oldest Shiite mosque's, which was the target of a terrorist attack in 2015.

References

Kuwait City